Events from the year 1805 in Scotland.

Incumbents

Law officers 
 Lord Advocate – Sir James Montgomery, Bt
 Solicitor General for Scotland – Robert Blair

Judiciary 
 Lord President of the Court of Session – Lord Succoth
 Lord Justice General – The Duke of Montrose
 Lord Justice Clerk – Lord Granton

Events 
 5 June – Edinburgh engraver David Scott and potter Hugh Adamson are executed at Glasgow Cross for forging banknotes.
 21 October – Battle of Trafalgar: A British Royal Navy fleet led by Admiral Horatio Nelson defeats a combined French and Spanish fleet off the coast of Spain. Around 1,150 of the 18,000 men on the British ships were born in Scotland.
 The planned village of New Scone is established.
 John and James Crombie establish the Crombie clothing company in Aberdeen.
 Isla Bank Mills at Keith are established.
 Killermont House is built at Bearsden for the Campbell-Colquhoun family.
 Rebuilding of Stobo Castle is begun.
 The Snow Tower (keep) of Kildrummy Castle collapses.
 Jean Maxwell is sentenced to a year's imprisoned in Kirkcudbright Tolbooth for "pretending to exercise witchcraft, sorcery, inchantment, conjuration, &c."
 English geologist George Bellas Greenough tours Scotland.

Births 
 26 January – Patrick Fairbairn, theologian (died 1874)
 30 January – Edward Sang, mathematician (died 1890)
 8 March – Rayner Stephens, radical reformer and Methodist minister (died 1879 in Stalybridge)
 26 March – Alexander John Scott, dissident theologian and educationalist (died 1866 in Switzerland)
 18 May – James Paterson journalist and antiquary (died 1876)
 26 May – Joseph Grant, poet (died 1835)
 3 August (bapt.) – William McCombie, agriculturalist (died 1880)
 8 August – Henry Craik, evangelical preacher and Hebraist (died 1866 in Bristol)
 11 October – James Salmon, architect (died 1888)
 28 October – John Thomson, classical composer (died 1841)
 November – Horatio McCulloch, landscape painter (died 1867)
 10 December – William Anderson, writer (died 1866 in London)
 13 December – Johann von Lamont, astronomer and physicist (died 1879 in Germany)
 21 December – Thomas Graham, chemist (died 1869 in Scotland)
 Alexander Forrester, educationalist in Nova Scotia (died 1869 in Canada)
 James Merry, ironmaster, Liberal politician and racehorse breeder (died 1877)
 David Boswell Reid, physician, chemist and "grandfather of air conditioning" (died 1863 in the United States)

Deaths 
 30 January – John Robison, physicist (born 1739)
 25 February – William Buchan, physician (born 1729)
 29 March – Jean Elliot, poet (born 1727)
 28 August – Alexander Carlyle, Church of Scotland leader (born 1722)
 21 October – George Duff, naval officer (born 1764; killed at Battle of Trafalgar)
 23 December – Francis Masson, plant hunter (born 1741; died in Montreal)

The arts
 Walter Scott's narrative poem The Lay of the Last Minstrel is published.

See also 
 1805 in the United Kingdom

References 

 
Years of the 19th century in Scotland
1800s in Scotland